Tiwanaku is a village in the La Paz Department, Bolivia with a population of 860 people. Towards the south of the village, there's the archaeological site of Tiwanaku.

References 

  Instituto Nacional de Estadistica de Bolivia  (INE)

Populated places in La Paz Department (Bolivia)